Super Friends is an American animated series about a team of superheroes which ran from 1973 to 1985 on ABC. In the 1990s, the show was being shown on Cartoon Network and more recently its sister channel, Boomerang. It is based on the Justice League and associated comic book characters published by DC Comics.

Each episode was 44 minutes long. After the third season, it was reduced to 22 minutes and ever so often expanded cast of characters by featuring other JLA heroes joining the main five Super Friends (Superman, Wonder Woman, Aquaman, Batman, and Robin) on a semi-regular basis. The series episodes varied from single episode stand-alone stories to episodes with two, three, or even four segments.

The varied incarnations of the group, from Super Friends (1973–1974) through The Super Powers Team: Galactic Guardians (1985–1986), were considered by their creators to be one continuous canon. There were a total of 93 episodes, along with two episodes of The New Scooby-Doo Movies, with Batman and Robin appearing in "The Dynamic Scooby Doo Affair" and "The Caped Crusader Caper."

Series overview

Super Friends episodes

Season 1: 1973

The All-New Super Friends Hour episodes

Season 2: 1977

The New Super Friends and Challenge of the Superfriends episodes

Season 3: 1978

The World's Greatest SuperFriends episodes

Season 4: 1979

Super Friends episodes

Season 5: 1980

Season 6: 1981

Season 7: 1983 (the "lost" season)
This season didn't air during a regularly scheduled Saturday morning time-slot, but did get aired when the series began to get aired in repeats/reruns on other networks. Interesting side note: In prior series, The Wonder Twins were only paired up with Superman, Batman & Robin or Wonder Woman. This series found them teaming up with other Justice Leaguers. In "Roller Coaster" they're paired with Atom. In "Two Gleeks" they're paired with Wonder Woman and Green Lantern. In "Unexpected Treasure" they're paired with Hawkman & Hawkgirl. In "Space Racers" they're paired with Wonder Woman & Flash.  In "Pint of Life" they're paired with Aquaman. In “Invasion of The Space Dolls” and “Bully For You” they’re paired with Batman and Robin. In "One Small Step For Superman" they're paired with Superman and Batman. This is the final season that Olan Soule voices Batman and Shannon Farnon voices Wonder Woman..

Super Friends: The Legendary Super Powers Show episodes

Super Friends: The Legendary Super Powers Show was the first Super Friends series in a new format since 1979's The World's Greatest SuperFriends. Continuing the previous three years' policy of producing short stories, this series' format was two stories per half-hour, so all the separate stories were ten minutes long each. Firestorm, a well established teenage superhero in the DC Comics Universe, was added to the lineup of characters. Continuing the trend from the "lost season" episodes, the Wonder Twins were paired with other Justice League members, as opposed to always teaming up with Wonder Woman or Batman & Robin. In "Case of the Shrinking Super Friends" they are teamed with Firestorm and Robin. In "Uncle Mxyzptlk" they work with Firestorm and Samurai. In "Village of The Lost Souls" they work with Wonder Woman and Apache Chief. Despite appearing in the opening credits, Aquaman and The Flash are not in this version. This is the only version of The Super Friends that doesn't include Aquaman. Adam West replaces Olan Soule who voiced Batman. Connie Cawfield replaces Shannon Farnon who voiced Wonder Woman.

Season 8: 1984

The Super Powers Team: Galactic Guardians episodes

B.J. Ward replaces Connie Cawfield as the voice of Wonder Woman.

Season 9: 1985

DVD releases

References

External links
 The Ultimate Super Friends episode guide
 Super Friends Episode Guide
 All-New Super Friends Hour episodes

Episodes
Super Friends episodes
Lists of American children's animated television series episodes